Red Man Mountain was named in 1917 because of the red color of the rock and in contrast to nearby White Man Mountain. It is located in the Blue Range of the Canadian Rockies.  Located along the Continental Divide of the Americas, it is also on the boundary between British Columbia and Alberta.


See also
 List of peaks on the British Columbia–Alberta border

References

Two-thousanders of Alberta
Two-thousanders of British Columbia
Canadian Rockies
Great Divide of North America